is a Japanese professional Go player. She became the youngest ever female professional Go player in Japan on April 1, 2019. She made her professional debut on April 22, 2019 in the preliminary round of the Ryusei tournament in western Japan at age 10 years and one month, breaking the record held by Rina Fujisawa in 2010 at age 11 years and 8 months. She is also the first Go player to turn pro under Nihon Ki-in's special screening system for "prospective, talented" players who can compete with top players from other countries.

Biography 
Born in 2009 in Tokyo, Japan, Nakamura is the daughter of Shinya Nakamura, a 9-dan professional Go player. She started playing the ancient board game with her father when she was three and has been competing in national tournaments in Japan since she was seven.

At the end of her first calendar year (2019) as a professional, the Power Report (for December 30, 2019) says "Sumire’s record for the first 'year' (actually nine months) of her career was 17–7, a winning record of 70.8%. These stats were the best of the 13 new 1-dans who debuted in 2019."

According to "The Power Report: Woman power hits Japanese go" at American Go Association's E-Journal, Nakamura is doing amazingly well in the first third of 2021 (January 1 to April 30). For this period, she has the most wins (21 wins to 2 losses) at the Nihon Ki-in, the best streak of consecutive wins (10 wins since March 18), and the best winning percentage (91.3% with no rivals of either gender in sight).

On 6 February 2023, at the age of 13 years and 11 months, Nakamura became the youngest ever winner of the Women's Kisei. She defeated defending champion Ueno Asami by two games to one.

References

External links 
 Sumire Nakamura profile of The nihon ki-in
 10-year-old Japanese go professional debuts on international stage, The Japan Times, May 21, 2019
 Nakamura Sumire official games

Living people
2009 births
Japanese Go players
Female Go players
People from Tokyo
People from Osaka